Ervik may refer to:

Places
Ervik, Bergen, a village in the Åsane borough of the city of Bergen in Norway
Ervik, Vestland, a village in Stad municipality, Vestland county, Norway
Ervik Church, a church in the village of Ervik in Stad municipality, Vestland county, Norway
Ervik, Trøndelag, a village in Ørland municipality, Trøndelag county, Norway

People
Danny Ervik (born 1989), a Swedish footballer who plays for Falkenbergs FF as a defender
Eskil Ervik (born 1975), a Norwegian speedskater